The Book of Elchasai or the Book of Elxai is a lost prophetic book, written during the reign of Trajan (reigned  98 –117), that contained laws and apocalyptic prophecies pertaining to Jewish Christian and Gnostic doctrines. It is known only from fragments quoted in the early Christian writings of Hippolytus of Rome, Eusebius, Epiphanius of Salamis, and Origen. The book was used by a number of Transjordanian sects, including Ebionites, Essenes, Nazarenes, and especially by Elcesaites who based their origins on it.

Content 
According to Hippolytus's Refutation of All Heresies, the Book of Elchasai was the source of a number of Elcesaite beliefs and practices. It encourages following the Law (including circumcision), as well as ascetic practices. Sexual desire is presented as wickedness, but a sin that could be cured through baptism. The book uses numbers and measures to foretell the future and further advocates healing rituals, as well as following a schedule based on astrology. The universe is held to be governed by principles created by God, who is called "the great and most high God".  God's son (Christ, also called "the mighty king") along with the Holy Spirit (who is a female entity) are depicted as angels of enormous size. Christ is held to have lived on earth repeatedly through reincarnation, sometimes arriving through virgin births. Seven witnesses are called to confirm the teachings of Elchasai. The book is also apocalyptic, expatiating on an impending crisis. It condemns sacrifices and rejects the eating of meat.

History 
The Book of Elchasai was written around the Parthian War of 114-117 AD in Aramaic by a Mesopotamian Jew. The purpose of the book may have been to bring comfort to Jews surviving the massacre during the war. The book describes angelic beings of "stupendous" size and their announcement of universal destruction. These beings revealed the requirements which would allow absolution on the judgment day. Similar enormous angels are also described in 3 Enoch such as Metatron, but Elchasai is particularly describing Christ and the Holy Spirit. The book contains a prediction of a war among wicked angels. Over hundred years later, a Hellenistic version of this manuscript was used by Syrian Judeo-Christians. Epiphananius considered this book heretical.

Alcibiades of Apamea was described by Hippolytus as a "strange demon" having possession of this book of revelations. Hippolytus refuted Alcibiades claims that the book was "a secret writing" and those who listened to the message of the book would receive remission of all their sins. The actual contents of the book were only revealed to converts, those who are willing to follow Alcibiades.

Ibn al-Nadim 
Elchasai is considered to be a historical figure. The Kitāb al-Fihrist references a manuscript, written by Muslim scholar Ibn al-Nadim in which he identifies Elchasai instituting the Babylonian baptists sect of Mughtasilah (practitioners of ablution) or katharioi. This sect was based upon the revelations that he had in his twenties. One of the followers of Elchasai was Mani, who joined Elchasai when he was only four years old by his father who was a convert to the Mughtasilah sect. Mani went on to form his own Gnostic sect known as the Manicheans.

Notes

References

Citations

Bibliography 

1st-century books
2nd-century books
Gnostic texts
Gnostic apocrypha
Jewish Christian literature
Lost books
Prophecy
Elcesaites